George Harold Hohman, Jr. (June 2, 1932 – November 20, 2006) was an American teacher and politician.

Born in St. Louis, Missouri, Hohman moved with his family to Glennie, Michigan and then graduated from high school in Oscoda, Michigan in 1950. In 1952, Hohman served in the United States Army and studied the Russian language. In 1954, Hohman was sent to Fort Richardson in Alaska to study the Russian language and how this influenced the Native Alaskan language.

After his service in the United States Army, Hohman graduated from Michigan State University. In 1962, he moved back to Alaska and settled in Bethel, Alaska where he taught school.

From 1967 to 1973, Hohman served in the Alaska House of Representatives and was a Democrat. Then, from 1973 to 1981, Hohman served in the Alaska State Senate.

In 1981, he was accused of accepting a bribe to use his influence to get state appropriations to buy a CL215 water-bomber aircraft for fighting forest fires.  He was also charged with attempting to bribe State Representative Russ Meekins, Jr, to assist him.  Hohman Jr. was found guilty of felonious bribery and receiving a bribe and was sentenced to 3 years in prison with two years suspended and fined $30,000. As a convicted felon he expelled from the Alaska Senate.

Hohman died from cancer at a hospital in Anchorage, Alaska.

Notes

External links
 

1932 births
2006 deaths
Politicians from St. Louis
People from Bethel, Alaska
People expelled from United States state legislatures
Michigan State University alumni
Educators from Alaska
Democratic Party members of the Alaska House of Representatives
Democratic Party Alaska state senators
Alaska politicians convicted of crimes
Deaths from cancer in Alaska
People from Alcona County, Michigan
Educators from Michigan
Educators from Missouri
20th-century American politicians